The 2021 NBA playoffs was the postseason tournament of the National Basketball Association's 2020–21 season. With the COVID-19 pandemic impacting the NBA for the second consecutive year, the regular season was reduced to 72 games for each team and the start date of the playoffs was moved from its usual time in mid-April to May 22, 2021. It ended with the 2021 NBA Finals in July.

The 2021 NBA Finals matchup featured the Milwaukee Bucks and the Phoenix Suns. Game 1 of the series was played on July 6, where the Suns took down the Bucks 118–105. Game 2 was played on July 8 at the Phoenix Suns Arena (now called Footprint Center) and ended with a score of  118–108 in favor of the  Suns. The  Bucks won the NBA Finals in six games after being down 0–2, their first championship since 1971.

Both the defending champion Los Angeles Lakers and the 2020 NBA Finals runner-up Miami Heat lost in the first round to the eventual finalists: the Phoenix Suns and the Milwaukee Bucks, respectively. The Suns advanced to their first NBA Finals since 1993 after winning the Western Conference Finals against the Los Angeles Clippers in six games; the Bucks also won the Eastern Conference Finals in six games, against the Atlanta Hawks to reach their first NBA Finals since 1974.

It was the first year the NBA used a 20-team playoff, with a two-stage system in both conferences, with 16 of the 20 teams advancing to the second stage.  The first stage, the NBA Play-In Games, was a four-team playoff in each conference for the No. 7 to No. 10 seeds in each conference.  In this format, the No. 7 and No. 8 teams need to win one game to advance to the second stage, with a double chance, while the No. 9 and No. 10 teams need to win two games to advance, eliminated by just one loss.

Overview

Notable updates to postseason appearances
The Portland Trail Blazers entered their eighth consecutive postseason, which was the longest active streak in the NBA until their failure to qualify the following year.
The Boston Celtics entered their seventh consecutive postseason.
The Utah Jazz and Milwaukee Bucks (which entered their first Finals appearance since 1974) entered their fifth consecutive postseason.
The Philadelphia 76ers entered their fourth consecutive postseason.
The Brooklyn Nets, Los Angeles Clippers and Denver Nuggets entered their third consecutive postseason.
The Miami Heat, Los Angeles Lakers and Dallas Mavericks entered their second consecutive postseason.
The Washington Wizards made their first postseason appearance since 2018.
The Atlanta Hawks (which entered their first Conference Finals appearance since 2015) and Memphis Grizzlies made their first postseason appearance since 2017.
The New York Knicks made their first postseason appearance since 2013.
The Phoenix Suns made their first postseason appearance since 2010 and their first Finals appearance since 1993.
The Houston Rockets missed the playoffs for the first time in nine years.
The Toronto Raptors missed the playoffs for the first time in eight years.
The Oklahoma City Thunder and Indiana Pacers missed the playoffs for the first time in six years.
The Orlando Magic missed the playoffs for the first time in three years.
The San Antonio Spurs returned to the postseason after missing the playoffs the previous year, but were eliminated after losing to Memphis in the first stage of the Page–McIntyre system system tournament.
The Golden State Warriors returned to the postseason after missing the playoffs the previous year, being the first team to be eliminated from the Page–McIntyre system tournament with the double chance.  They were the No. 8 seed, losing to the No. 7 Los Angeles Lakers in the first game of the first stage, then losing to No. 9 Memphis in the second game of the first stage.

Notable occurrences
The Memphis Grizzlies became the first No. 9 seed to advance to the playoffs, defeating the Golden State Warriors in the second game of the first stage play-in.
The Milwaukee Bucks swept the Miami Heat in the first round, marking the 45th straight year a sweep occurred in the NBA playoffs. The last year a sweep did not occur in the playoffs was 1976.
With Miami not winning a road game, their streak of winning a road game in a playoff series ends at 23, a streak that started in 2011. This record would be surpass by the Warriors in the following year.
The Mavericks-Clippers series was the first of the 2021 playoffs to have a Game 7, making it the 22nd consecutive NBA postseason to feature a Game 7. The last time a Game 7 did not take place in the playoffs was 1999.
Not counting the 2020 NBA playoffs which was held at a neutral site, the Mavericks-Clippers series was the first in NBA history where the road team won the first six games of a best-of-7 and the first since 1995 to have the road team win the first five games of a best-of-7.
Both 2020 NBA finalists (Los Angeles Lakers and Miami Heat) were eliminated in the first round. This was the third time overall and the first since 2007 that this had happened, in which the Miami Heat were also one of the finalist who were eliminated.
The Los Angeles Lakers first round loss to the Phoenix Suns marked the first time that the defending NBA champions was eliminated in the first round of the playoffs since the San Antonio Spurs in the 2015 playoffs.
With the Boston Celtics, Dallas Mavericks, Los Angeles Lakers, and Miami Heat eliminated in the first round (along with the Cleveland Cavaliers, Detroit Pistons, Golden State Warriors, San Antonio Spurs, and Toronto Raptors failing to qualify for the playoffs), by the second round the 2021 playoffs ensured one team of its first championship in the 21st century.
This Finals was the first since 2014 to not include Andre Iguodala, who had played in the past six finals with the Golden State Warriors and Miami Heat.
For the first time in his 18-year career, LeBron James lost a first-round playoffs series when the Los Angeles Lakers were eliminated by the Phoenix Suns in Game 6.
Damian Lillard set an NBA record of 12 three-point field goals made in a single playoff game, which was previously held by Klay Thompson in 2016.
LeBron James became the only player in NBA history to be in the playoff top 10 for all five major statistical categories (points, rebounds, assists, blocks, and steals).
Chris Paul became the first player to reach 15 assists with 0 turnovers three separate times in the NBA playoffs.
Nikola Jokić joined Wilt Chamberlain and Kareem Abdul-Jabbar as the only players with 30 points, 20 rebounds, 10 assists in an NBA playoff game.
Kevin Durant became the first player in NBA history with 45 points, 15 rebounds, and 10 assists in a single playoff game. He also set an NBA record for most points in a Game 7 with 48 against the Milwaukee Bucks.
The Los Angeles Clippers became the first team in NBA history to overcome an 0–2 deficit twice in the same postseason. They also made it to the Western Conference Finals for the first time in franchise history.
With the Clippers advancing to the Western Conference Finals to face the Suns, this ensured that a Pacific Division team played in the NBA Finals for the seventh consecutive postseason.
The Milwaukee Bucks won a Game 7 on the road for the first time in franchise history.
Neither the first-seeded team nor the second-seeded team made the Eastern Conference Finals for the second straight year. 
The Atlanta Hawks became the fourth team in the last 40 years to reach the Conference Finals with a midseason coaching replacement.
Neither first-seeded team made the Conference Finals for the first time since 1994.
Devin Booker joined Charles Barkley and LeBron James as the only players with 40-point triple-double in a conference finals game. He also joined Oscar Robertson and Luka Dončić as the only players with a 40-point triple-double before turning 25.
Deandre Ayton became the first player in the shot-clock era with a 70+ FG% in any 12-game postseason span (min. 100 att), and the first since 1954–55 NBA season.
Deandre Ayton became the first player in NBA history to average 15 points and 10 rebounds while shooting at least 65% from the field in a single postseason.
Jae Crowder now owns the longest active finals streak when the Phoenix Suns made the NBA Finals, having also made it last year with Miami.
Chris Paul became the oldest player in NBA history with 40+ points in a closeout game. He is also the second oldest player to drop 40 points in any playoff game.
With Rajon Rondo losing in the Western Conference Finals to the Suns, Shaquille O'Neal's 37-year streak of having a former teammate in the NBA Finals came to an end.
The Phoenix Suns became the first team in NBA history to move on to the NBA Finals after missing the postseason in the prior ten seasons. They also held the worst record (.302 winning pct) in five seasons prior to an appearance in the final postseason round in the history of the NBA, NFL, NHL, or MLB.
Both NBA finalists in the 2020–2021 season have not been in the finals for over two decades (the Suns in 1993, the Bucks in 1974).
Trae Young became the second player in NBA history to average 28+ PPG and 9+ APG in a single playoff run (minimum 15 games, LeBron James in 2018).
Trae Young tied LeBron James and Dirk Nowitzki by scoring the 4th most points in a Conference Finals game with 48 against the Milwaukee Bucks.
Giannis Antetokounmpo became the 5th player in NBA history with 9+ 30/10 games in a single postseason since 1963.
By winning the 2021 Eastern Conference Finals, the Milwaukee Bucks are the only NBA franchise to win both the Eastern & Western Conference Titles.
Chris Paul joins Michael Jordan as the only players with 30+ points and 9+ assists in an NBA Finals debut. Jordan accomplished this feat in 1991. He also joined Kareem Abdul-Jabbar and Tim Duncan as players with 30+ points in an NBA Finals game age 36 or older.
Deandre Ayton became the fourth player in the shot-clock era (since 1955) with at least 20 points, 15 rebounds, and shooting 80+ FG% in an NBA Finals game (Bill Russell, Kareem-Abdul Jabbar, Wilt Chamberlain). Ayton joins Abdul-Jabbar as the only players to do so in their Finals debuts.
Chris Paul scored or assisted on 54 points in Game 1, the 3rd most in an NBA Finals debut all time (Allen Iverson with 61 in 2001, Michael Jordan with 60 in 1991).
The Phoenix Suns became the third team to make 20+ three-point shots in a Finals game, joining the Cleveland Cavaliers, and the Golden State Warriors.
Giannis Antetokounmpo joined Shaquille O'Neal as the only players with 40+ points and 10+ rebounds in back-to-back Finals games. He also scored 103 points through the first three Finals game of his career, ranking fourth behind Rick Barry (122), Allen Iverson (106), and Willis Reed (104).
Devin Booker set a new record for most points for a player in his first NBA playoffs appearance, accumulating 601 points, overtaking Ricky Barry (521) and Julius Erving (518).
The Suns became the first team in NBA history to lose a Finals game despite shooting better than 50% and keeping their opponent below at least 42%.
Khris Middleton and Devin Booker became the 4th pair of opponents to put up at least 40 points in the same game.
Devin Booker became the seventh player in NBA history to put up back-to-back 40 point games in the Finals. Booker is also the first Suns player to achieve this and is also the first overall to lose both of these games.
Devin Booker's 82 points in Games 4 and 5 of the NBA Finals reflects the highest total of any player who lost consecutive Finals Games (John Havlicek and LeBron James each had 80 in consecutive games).
Devin Booker joined Rick Barry as the only players to record at least ten 30 point games in their first postseason all time.
The Suns became the first team in NBA history to lose a playoff game shooting at least 55% from the field and at least 60% from three.
Giannis Antetokounmpo and Khris Middleton became the 2nd pair of teammates to record at least 500 points and 100 assists in a single postseason.
Giannis Antetokounmpo, Jrue Holiday, and Khris Middleton became the 5th trio of teammates in NBA Finals history to record at least 25 points while shooting at least 50% from the field in the same game.
Giannis Antetokounmpo became the 5th player in NBA Finals history to record at least 30 points, 5 assists, 5 rebounds, and 0 turnovers.
Giannis Antetokounmpo became the 2nd player in NBA Finals history to record at least 3 games recording 40 points and 10 rebounds.
With Giannis and Thanasis Antetokounmpo winning a championship this year, they join Kostas Antetokounmpo (2020 with Los Angeles Lakers) as the only sibling trio in NBA history to win a championship.
Giannis Antetokounmpo became the 7th player in NBA Finals history to record a 50-point game. He also tied Bob Pettit for the most points scored in a Finals closeout game.
Giannis Antetokounmpo became the 5th player in NBA Finals history to record at least 30 points, 5 assists, 5 rebounds, and 0 turnovers.
Giannis Antetokounmpo became the 1st player in NBA Finals history to record 40 points, 10 rebounds, and 5 blocks in a game, then became the first to record 50 points, 10 rebounds, and 5 blocks in a game.
Giannis Antetokounmpo recorded the second-most games in a single postseason scoring at least 30 points and 10 rebounds.
Chris Paul became the 1st player in NBA history to blow four separate 2–0 series leads in a best-of-7 series.
Giannis Antetokounmpo became the 3rd player in NBA history to win multiple regular-season MVPs, Defensive Player of the Year Award, and Finals MVP (Hakeem Olajuwon and Michael Jordan)
Giannis Antetokounmpo became the 2nd player in NBA history to win multiple regular-season MVPs and Finals MVP while playing at the power forward position (Tim Duncan).
Giannis Antetokounmpo became the 1st player in NBA Finals history to average 30 points, 10 rebounds, and 5 assists while shooting at least 60% FG. In addition, he is the 1st player in NBA Finals history to average 30 points, 10 rebounds, 5 assists, 1 block, and 1 steal while shooting at least 50% on field goals.
Giannis Antetokounmpo became the 9th player in NBA history to win multiple MVPs and a Finals MVP. He joins Kareem Abdul-Jabbar and Tim Duncan as the only ones to do so at 26 years old or younger.
Giannis Antetokounmpo became the first player in NBA history with 5 All-Star selections, 5 All-NBA selections, multiple MVPs, 1 Finals MVP, and 1 DPOY before turning 27 years old.
Giannis Antetokounmpo tied Kevin Durant by averaging the 5th most PPG in an NBA Finals win with 35.2 (Durant averaged 35.2 PPG in 2017).
Giannis Antetokounmpo became the 1st player in NBA history to win Most Improved Player, MVP, Defensive Player of the Year, and Finals MVP.
Giannis Antetokounmpo became the fourth international player and third European player to win the Finals MVP, joining Hakeem Olajuwon (Nigeria) in 1994 and 1995, Tony Parker (France) in 2007, and Dirk Nowitzki (Germany) in 2011.
The Milwaukee Bucks became the fifth team in NBA Finals history to overcome an 0–2 deficit and win the title. They also became the third team to win 4 consecutive games after being down 0–2. The last team to accomplish this feat is the 2006 Miami Heat.
The Milwaukee Bucks became the second team in NBA playoff history to overcome an 0–2 deficit twice in the same postseason (2021 Los Angeles Clippers).

Format

The NBA Board of Governors approved a format for the 2020–21 season to have a play-in tournament involving the teams that ranked 7th through 10th in each conference. The 7th place team and 8th place team participate in the double-chance game, with the winner advancing to the playoffs as the 7-seed. The loser then plays the winner of the elimination game between the 9th place and 10th place teams to determine the playoff's 8-seed. The NBA's regular playoff format would then proceed as normal.

Under the NBA's regular playoff format, the eight teams with the most wins in each conference qualified for the playoffs. The seedings were based on each team's record. Each conference's bracket was fixed; there was no reseeding. All rounds were best-of-seven series; the series ended when one team won four games, and that team advanced to the next round. All rounds, including the NBA Finals, were in a 2–2–1–1–1 format. In the conference playoffs, home court advantage went to the higher-seeded team (number one being the highest). Seeding was based on each team's regular season record within a conference; if two teams had the same record, standard tiebreaker rules were used. Conference seedings were ignored for the NBA Finals: Home court advantage went to the team with the better regular season record, and, if needed, ties were broken based on head-to-head record, followed by intra-conference record.

Playoff qualifying
On April 25, 2021, the Utah Jazz became the first team to clinch a playoff spot. While noted in the below tables, division titles have no bearing on seeding.

Eastern Conference

Indiana (34–38) and Charlotte (33–39) also secured play-in berths but did not advance to the playoffs.

Western Conference

Golden State (39–33) and San Antonio (33–39) also secured play-in berths but did not advance to the playoffs.

Bracket
Teams in bold advanced to the next round. The numbers to the left of each team indicate the team's seeding in its conference, and the numbers to the right indicate the number of games the team won in that round. The division champions are marked by an asterisk. Teams with home court advantage, the higher seeded team, are shown in italics.

First round
Note: Times are EDT (UTC−4) as listed by NBA. If the venue is located in a different time zone, the local time is also given.

Eastern Conference first round

(1) Philadelphia 76ers vs. (8) Washington Wizards

This was the sixth playoff meeting between these two teams, with the 76ers winning three of the first five meetings.

(2) Brooklyn Nets vs. (7) Boston Celtics

This was the third playoff meeting between these two teams, but the first since the New Jersey Nets relocated to Brooklyn and became the Brooklyn Nets in 2012, with the Nets winning the first two meetings.

(3) Milwaukee Bucks vs. (6) Miami Heat

The Bucks struggled offensively against Miami, shooting only 16% (5–31) on three-point shots. The game went into overtime thanks to a game-tying, buzzer-beating layup by Jimmy Butler, but Milwaukee was able to pull away and win on a Khris Middleton jump shot, made with only 0.5 seconds left.

The Bucks erupted for 46 points in the first quarter, setting a new franchise playoff record, en route to a dominating 132–98 victory. The Bucks would make 22 three-pointers, after making only 5 in game 1.

The Bucks would cruise to another convincing victory in game 3, to take a commanding 3–0 series lead on Miami. In games 2 & 3, the Heat led for only :17, out of 96 minutes of game time.

Though Miami built a 7-point lead at halftime, the Bucks went on a 24–6 run in the third quarter to take a lead they would not relinquish, leading to a four-game sweep of the Heat.

This was the third playoff meeting between these two teams, with the Heat winning the first two meetings.

(4) New York Knicks vs. (5) Atlanta Hawks

In Game 1, Trae Young hits the game-winning floater with 0.9 seconds left.

This was the third playoff meeting between these two teams, with the Knicks winning the first two meetings.

Western Conference first round

(1) Utah Jazz vs. (8) Memphis Grizzlies

This was the first playoff meeting between the Jazz and the Grizzlies.

(2) Phoenix Suns vs. (7) Los Angeles Lakers

This was the 13th playoff meeting between these two teams, with the Lakers winning eight of the first 12 meetings.

(3) Denver Nuggets vs. (6) Portland Trail Blazers

This was the fourth playoff meeting between these two teams, with Portland winning two of the first three meetings.

(4) Los Angeles Clippers vs. (5) Dallas Mavericks

This was the second playoff meeting between these two teams, with the Clippers winning the first meeting.

Conference semifinals
Note: Times are EDT (UTC−4) as listed by NBA. If the venue is located in a different time zone, the local time is also given.

Eastern Conference semifinals
This was the first time both Conference Semifinals went seven games since 2001.

(1) Philadelphia 76ers vs. (5) Atlanta Hawks
The Atlanta Hawks dominated during the early part of the game, leading by as much as 26 points,  The 76ers however performed a major rally, eventually cutting the deficit to just 3 points with a minute left in Regulation, 20 seconds of game time later however Bogdan Bogdanovic would hit a clutch 3, the 76ers' would make it a 3-point game again with 28.7 seconds left, Joel Embiid then later committed a clear path foul, thus not only giving Atlanta 2 free throws, but possession of the ball, the Hawks would seal the game when Trae Young gave an alley-oop assist to John Collins.

Trae Young secured a double-double with 35 points & 10 assists for The Hawks.  Joel Embiid scored 39 points for the 76ers.After the 76ers' Started the game up 20–4 with 6 minutes left in the 1st quarter, the Hawks rallied and the game remained close until the end of the 3rd quarter in which the 76ers' blew the game open with a 14–0 run at one point, resulting in the series being tied at a game apiece.

Joel Embiid secured a double-double with 40 points & 13 rebounds, while Danny Green passed 8 assists.  Trae Young also scored a double-double with 21 points & 11 assists while John Collins grabbed 10 rebounds.The 76ers' Cruised their way to victory throughout the entire game thanks in part to Joel Embiid's 27 points, 9 rebounds, & 8 assists.

Trae Young Scored 28 points & 8 assists in the losing effort for the hawks.Despite being down by 18, the Atlanta hawks staged a comeback, eventually taking their first lead since it was 10–12 in the 1st quarter, by the start of the 4th quarter. the game remained deadlocked for the rest of the game, as the 76ers' were up by 4 with 2:20 left in the 4th quarter, the Hawks responded with a 7–0 run, leading by 3 with 49.6 seconds left, after Embiid got fouled & made both free throws to make it 101-100 and a turnover by John Collins, The 76ers' had a chance at leading the series 3 games to 1, Embiid's go-ahead shot fell short and the ball went out-of-bounds last touched by Ben Simmons, giving Atlanta the ball with 8.2 seconds left.

After Trae Young made both of his free throws to make it a 3-point game, the sixers had 6.6 seconds left to Tie it, but Seth Curry's Game-tying 3-pointer was no good, giving Atlanta the comeback victory.In the pivotal Game 5, The 76ers' appeared to be on their way to victory, leading by as much as 26 points and with a 99.7% win probability according to ESPN.  However the Hawks, who came back from 18 down in the last game, performed one of the most memorable comebacks in NBA Playoff history.  At one point, the Sixers were still up 104–94 with 4 minutes left in the game, only for the hawks to respond with a 13–0 run to make it a 3-point lead with 50 seconds left in the 4th quarter in what was their First lead of the entire game.

The Climax of the game came with 12 seconds left, after a blocking foul by Danilo Gallinari, which sent Joel Embiid To the line, he would miss both free throws and Atlanta then had possession of the ball.  Later on, Trae Young would seal it with 2 clutch free throws, Seth Curry then made a meaningless basket to make the final score 109–106 in favor the Hawks, who were now one game away from their first conference finals birth since 2015.  Once the final buzzer sounded, the 76ers' faithful booed their entire team off the floor due to the collapse.

Trae Young led the Hawks' Comeback victory with 39 points & 7 assists.

The Hawks' Became the 6th team in NBA Playoffs history to win a playoff game after trailing by 18+ points entering the 4th quarter in the shot clock eraWith the Hawks looking to advance to the Eastern Conference finals at their home floor, they would lead by as much as 12 points during the 2nd quarter,  But the 76ers' who were trying to stave off elimination after back-to-back collapses, managed to take control of the game.

However, the game once again would go down to the wire, as the Sixers were up 94–87 with 3 minutes left, the Hawks' responded with 2 Three-pointers from Gallinari & Young, who cut the deficit to one with 1:59 left in the 4th quarter.  The Lights at State Farm Arena would then go out, causing a delay for one minute, once the lights came back on, Philadelphia immediately responded by preserving the lead as Tobias Harris would make 2 Game-sealing Free throws to send the series back to Philadelphia for Game 7 on Sunday Night.In front of a loud Wells Fargo Center, Game 7 was a deadlocked affair, with neither team able to gain a double-digit lead.  The game, & the series, would once again come down to the wire. With 1:12 left in the 4th quarter, the Hawks were leading 93-92 and had the ball. At the climax of the game, Kevin Huerter attempted a 3-point shot that missed, but was fouled by Matisse Thybulle, sending him to the line where he would make 3 free-throws. On the next possession, Danilo Gallinari stripped Joel Embiid of the ball, who then dunked to make it 98–92 in favor of the Hawks, who from that point on, had complete control of the game. The Atlanta Hawks upset the top-seeded 76ers to advance to the Eastern Conference finals for the first time in 6 years.

Kevin Huerter was the Hawks' top scorer with 27 points, John Collins grabbed 16 rebounds & Trae Young passed 10 assists.

For the Sixers: Joel Embiid scored 31 points, while Tobias Harris grabbed 14 rebounds.

Ben Simmons' Game 7 Performance was criticized as he scored only 5 points with 13 assists. With 3:30 left in the 4th quarter, with the Sixers down 2, Simmons would pass a wide open basket to Matisse Thybulle, who in turn got fouled and split the free throws. Sixers' coach Doc Rivers was asked in his post-game conference if Simmons could be the point guard of a championship team, with Rivers responding "I don't know the answer to that right now". Joel Embiid cited the decision as the turning point of the game.

Eventually it would be Ben Simmons, Andre Drummond & Seth Curry's last playoff game as a 76er, as all of them would be traded to the Brooklyn Nets on February 10, 2022.

This was the third playoff meeting between these two teams, with the 76ers winning both previous meetings.

(2) Brooklyn Nets vs. (3) Milwaukee Bucks

Game 7 would go on to be an instant classic with both teams locked in for the entire game. In the final seconds of regulation, Kevin Durant appeared to have given the Nets a 1-point lead on a fadeaway three-point shot with 1 second left. Replay showed, however, that his foot was on the line. With the score tied at 109, Milwaukee had a chance to win the series, but Giannis Antetokounmpo's turnaround jump shot missed, sending the game into overtime. The Nets held a two-point lead until the final 90 seconds of overtime where the Bucks would score on back-to-back possessions to get on the board and take a 113–111 lead with 40 seconds remaining. The Nets had possession in the last 15 seconds of the game, concluding with yet another game-tying, almost-three-point jump shot attempt by Durant; however, it was all air. The Bucks subsequently sealed the game on two free throws by Brook Lopez (a former Net), sending them to the Eastern Conference Finals for the second time in three years. This marked the first game seven to go into overtime since 2006 involving the Dallas Mavericks and the San Antonio Spurs, which the Mavericks won and prevented the team from blowing a 3–1 lead to the Spurs. It was also the Bucks' first victory on the road in a postseason game seven, having gone 0–7 in previous playoff road game seven's. It was also became the sixth team in NBA playoff history and the first since the 2017–18 Cleveland Cavaliers that a road team won game seven in the postseason also joined by other teams the 1968–69 Boston Celtics (who upset the Los Angeles Lakers in the 1969 series.), 1970–71 Baltimore Bullets (who were swept by eventual champions Bucks in the 1971 series.), the 2006–07 Utah Jazz, 2007–08 San Antonio Spurs and 2017–18 Golden State Warriors, and also the third team in NBA playoff history to win game seven on the road in overtime joined the 2001–02 Los Angeles Lakers, and the 2005–06 Mavericks' team.

This was the fourth playoff meeting between these two teams, but the first since the New Jersey Nets relocated to Brooklyn and became the Brooklyn Nets in 2012, with the Bucks winning two of the first three meetings.

Western Conference semifinals

(1) Utah Jazz vs. (4) Los Angeles Clippers

The Clippers were trailing by 22 at the end of the first half in Game 6. They went down 25 at the start of the third quarter, before a retaliation led by Terance Mann allowed the Clippers to fight back to within 3 points at the end of the third quarter. In the fourth, the momentum from the third quarter and Utah's struggles allowed the Clippers to complete the comeback, becoming the first team to recover from being down 0–2 twice in the same playoffs, and reaching their first Conference Finals in franchise history.

This was the fourth playoff meeting between these two teams, with the Jazz winning the previous three meetings.

(2) Phoenix Suns vs. (3) Denver Nuggets

This was the fourth playoff meeting between these two teams, with Phoenix winning two of the first three meetings.

Conference finals

Note: Times are EDT (UTC−4) as listed by NBA. If the venue is located in a different time zone, the local time is also given.

Eastern Conference Finals

(3) Milwaukee Bucks vs. (5) Atlanta Hawks

Atlanta's top offensive star, Trae Young, scored 48 points in his conference finals debut, while the Hawks rallied in the 2nd half to beat the Bucks in game 1 in Milwaukee, aided by 5 offensive rebounds in the final 2 minutes.

The Bucks rode a 20–0 scoring run in the 2nd quarter to run away with a game 2 victory.

Trailing by 2 points going into the 4th quarter, the Bucks' Khris Middleton would carry Milwaukee to victory in game 3, outscoring Atlanta in the final quarter by himself, 20–17, en route to a game-high 38 points, putting the Bucks back in the lead in the series and getting back homecourt advantage. Atlanta's loss was also compounded when Trae Young suffered a bruised foot when he rolled his ankle over a referee's foot, leaving his status for the rest of the series in doubt.

The Bucks' 3-point woes returned in game 4, as the team only shot 21% (8–39) in a loss to Atlanta that evened the series once more. Even worse, the Bucks' superstar, Giannis Antetokounmpo, hyperextended his knee while trying to defend an alley-oop dunk, though an MRI the following day revealed no structural damage, and Antetokounmpo potentially available for either game 7 or the NBA Finals.

With both teams' stars out with injuries, both the Hawks and Bucks needed contributions from their other players in game 5. The Bucks would deliver, led by Brook Lopez's 33 points. In addition to Lopez, 3 other Bucks starters (Khris Middleton, Jrue Holiday, and Bobby Portis) scored at least 20 points. While Atlanta kept the game close, aided by Bogdan Bogdanovic's 28 points, the Bucks took a 3–2 series lead, leaving them one win away from the Eastern Conference championship.

Facing elimination, the Hawks got Trae Young back to start game 6, but he still struggled with his injured foot, scoring only 14 points. After leading Atlanta by only 4 points at halftime, Khris Middleton would score the Bucks' first 16 points of the 3rd quarter to build a 19-point lead going into the 4th quarter. The Bucks would weather a wave of hot shooting from Bogdan Bogdanovic and Cam Reddish, helped by a crucial 3-point shot by PJ Tucker, and an alley-oop dunk by Brook Lopez that essentially clinched the game and the series for the Bucks. The victory gave the Bucks the Eastern Conference championship, their 3rd overall conference title (though the previous two were for the Western Conference), and their first trip to the NBA Finals since 1974.

Game 6 was also the final game announced by famed baseketball broadcaster Marv Albert.

This was the fifth playoff meeting between these two teams, with each team winning two series apiece. Four months later, two teams from Milwaukee and Atlanta would meet again in a sports postseason as the Braves beat the Brewers in the 2021 NLDS.

Western Conference finals

(2) Phoenix Suns vs. (4) Los Angeles Clippers

' Deandre Ayton dunks in the game-winning alley-oop off the inbound pass from Jae Crowder with 0.7 seconds remaining.

The Clippers shot 0–12 in the fourth quarter on shots that could have tied the game or taken the lead. That is the most such attempts without a make in the fourth quarter of a game over the last 25 postseasons. During the last 8 seconds of the game when the Clippers trailed 1 point, there was a controversial call where Nicolas Batum of the Clippers deflected the ball off the finger tips of Cameron Payne of the Suns, but the ball was given to the Suns. There was no review of the play despite a heavy plea from the Clippers.

Chris Paul's 41 points matches his career high with that of his performance as a member of the Houston Rockets in Game 5 against the Utah Jazz in 2018, both of which were series clinchers. Paul once played for the Clippers from 2011 to 2017. Patrick Beverley shoved Paul during the timeout this led to an ejection, an flagrant foul, a technical foul and suspended by the league president, former All-Star player and former head coach Kiki VanDeWeghe and current league commissioner Adam Silver for the first game of the 2021–22 season and turned out to be the last game of Beverley's career with the Clippers team before being traded away twice to the Memphis Grizzlies and the Minnesota Timberwolves, Beverley's suspension became the first player to be suspended for first game of the following season since Andrew Bynum in the 2011 NBA playoffs for shoving and elbowing J. J. Barea during the Los Angeles Lakers eventual four–game sweep by the eventual NBA champions, the Dallas Mavericks.

This was the second playoff meeting between these two teams, with the Suns winning the previous meeting. 

NBA Finals: (W2) Phoenix Suns vs. (E3) Milwaukee BucksNote: Times are EDT (UTC−4) as listed by NBA. If the venue is located in a different time zone, the local time is also given.''

This was the second playoff meeting between these two teams, with the Bucks winning the first meeting.

Statistical leaders

Notable fan incidents
Throughout the playoffs, there were a number of incidents at multiple games involving fans:

May 26: A fan spat at Trae Young during Game 2 of the Hawks/Knicks series at Madison Square Garden in New York City.
May 26: A fan dumped popcorn on Russell Westbrook during Game 2 of the Wizards/76ers series at Wells Fargo Center in Philadelphia.
May 26: Three fans were verbally disruptive towards the family of Ja Morant during Game 2 of the Grizzlies/Jazz series at Vivint Arena in Salt Lake City. There were also insensitive remarks made towards the family of Dillon Brooks.
May 30: A fan threw a water bottle at Kyrie Irving following Game 4 of the Celtics/Nets series at TD Garden in Boston after the game.
May 31: A fan ran onto the court during Game 4 of the Wizards/76ers series at Capital One Arena in Washington, D.C.
June 20: A fan threw a can onto the court in the closing seconds of Game 7 of the Hawks/76ers series in Philadelphia.

Media coverage

Television
ESPN, ABC, TNT, and NBA TV broadcast the playoffs nationally in the United States. During the first two rounds, games were split by ESPN, ABC and TNT. TNT primarily aired games on Saturday through Wednesday, while ESPN on Friday and Saturday. For Thursday games, TNT had them in the first round and ESPN in the second round. ABC then aired selected first and second-round games on Friday through Sunday. NBA TV also televised selected games in the first round on Tuesday through Thursday. Regional sports networks affiliated with teams also broadcast the games, except for weekend games televised on ABC. ESPN/ABC had exclusive coverage of the Western Conference Finals while TNT had exclusive coverage of the Eastern Conference Finals. ABC had exclusive coverage of the NBA Finals for the 19th straight year.

This was the final postseason for Marv Albert, who announced his retirement on May 17, 2021. Albert, who turned 80 in June, has spent most of the last 31 years as the lead broadcaster for NBA coverage on TNT and NBC.

Notes

References

External links

Basketball – Reference.com's 2021 Playoffs section

Playoffs
National Basketball Association playoffs